Richard Harrison Smith (July 21, 1926 – January 25, 2021) was an American professional baseball player who appeared in seventy games over parts of five Major League Baseball seasons (1951–1955) as a member of the Pittsburgh Pirates. Smith was primarily a third baseman who also played shortstop and second base.

Biography
He attended Penn State University and Lock Haven University of Pennsylvania.

Smith's professional career lasted for a dozen seasons, beginning in 1949. His highest MLB batting average was .174 in forty-six at bats during his rookie 1951 campaign. Lifetime, he hit .134, with his twenty-five hits including two doubles and two triples. He was credited with eleven runs batted in. In his longest stint in the majors, Smith appeared in twenty-nine games for the last-place 1952 Pirates, but collecting seven hits and batting .106. The Pirates went 42–112 that year.

After his playing career, Smith became a professor of sports science and physical education at Pennsylvania State University, as well as an assistant coach of the Nittany Lions' varsity baseball team. He died on January 25, 2021, in Boalsburg, Pennsylvania.

References

External links

1926 births
2021 deaths
Águilas Cibaeñas players
American expatriate baseball players in the Dominican Republic
Baseball coaches from Pennsylvania
Baseball players from Pennsylvania
Charleston Rebels players
College baseball coaches
Dallas Rangers players
Greenville Pirates players
Hollywood Stars players
Lock Haven University of Pennsylvania alumni
Major League Baseball third basemen
New Orleans Pelicans (baseball) players
People from Cambria County, Pennsylvania
Pittsburgh Pirates players
Salt Lake City Bees players
San Diego Padres (minor league) players
Tallahassee Pirates players
Waco Pirates players